Fanning the Flames is an album by the American musician Maria Muldaur, released in 1996. Muldaur labeled the album's music "bluesiana," a combination of blues and Louisiana good-time music. Muldaur included songs with political or topical themes, a choice she had rarely made in the past.

The album peaked at No. 14 on Billboard'''s Blues Albums chart. It was Muldaur's first album for Telarc.

Production
Produced by John Snyder, Muldaur, and Elane Martone, the album was recorded at Dockside Studio Recordings, in Maurice, Louisiana. Bonnie Raitt duetted with Muldaur on "Somebody Was Watching Over Me". Mavis Staples, Johnny Adams, Ann Peebles, Tracy Nelson, and Huey Lewis also sang on, or contributed instrumentation to, the album. "Well, Well, Well" is a cover of the Bob Dylan song; Muldaur was inspired to record it after talking with Dylan about Jerry Garcia's death.

Critical receptionThe Washington Post thought that when Muldaur "sings blues, R&B or hillbilly music today, she no longer skips lightly over the rhythm; she now reinforces the beat with her vocal oomph, and her throaty growls give her vocals a sassy edge they never had before." Newsday wrote that "it's the ease with which Muldaur can shift from a raw Texas honky-tonk vibe to sly Chi-town sophistication that makes this collection of tunes so interesting."The Patriot-News stated that "longtime New Orleans keyboard stalwart David Torkanowski, while accorded minimal solo space, provides a vital melodic and harmonic foundation to the session." The Buffalo News'' concluded that Muldaur's "slightly surreal, baby-doll voice ... has deepened and roughened over the years, but her taste in what to sing remains gutsy and close to impeccable."

AllMusic wrote that "Muldaur belts out gritty blues and gospel and soulful R&B as very few can."

Track listing

References

Maria Muldaur albums
1996 albums
Telarc Records albums